State Route 131 (SR 131) is a primary state highway in the U.S. state of Virginia.  The state highway runs  from U.S. Route 460 Business (US 460 Business) north to US 460 and SR 24 within Appomattox.  SR 131 serves the Appomattox Historic District, which includes the downtown area of the town of Appomattox.

Route description

SR 131 begins at US 460 Business (Confederate Boulevard) on the east side of the town of Appomattox.  The state highway heads west along Oakleigh Avenue to the edge of the downtown area, where the highway turns south onto Church Street.  Before reaching the railroad tracks, which are part of Norfolk Southern Railway's Blue Ridge District, SR 131 heads onto Main Street, which is one-way toward the east.  Traffic heading west must use Harrell Street to Lee Street to the west end of Main Street's one-way section.  After one block on the two-way section of Main Street, SR 131 turns north onto Court Street, which serves the Appomattox County offices.  At the northern end of Court Street, SR 131 briefly runs concurrently with US 460 Business (Confederate Boulevard) before turning northeast onto Old Courthouse Road.  The state highway widens to a four-lane divided highway shortly before its northern terminus at US 460 (Richmond Highway), the freeway bypass of Appomattox.  SR 24 also heads west from the diamond interchange along the bypass toward Concord and northeast along the continuation of Old Courthouse Road toward Appomattox Court House National Historical Park and US 60.

Major intersections

References

External links

Virginia Highways Project: VA 131

131
State Route 131